Ergalatax margariticola, common name : the shouldered castor bean, is a species of sea snail, a marine gastropod mollusk in the family Muricidae, the murex snails or rock snails.

Description
The shell size varies between 14 mm and 40 mm

Distribution
This species is distributed in the Red Sea, the Indian Ocean along Aldabra, Chagos, Madagascar, the Mascarene Basin, the Seychelles, Tanzania, and in the Western Pacific Ocean and Japan.

References

 Dautzenberg, Ph. (1929). Mollusques testaces marins de Madagascar. Faune des Colonies Francaises, Tome III
 Taylor, J.D. (1971). Intertidal Zonation at Aldabra Atoll. Phil. Trns. Roy. Soc. Lond. B. 260, 173–213

External links

 Gastropods.com : Ergalatax margariticola; accessed : 19 November 2010

Ergalatax
Gastropods described in 1833